Dr. Essa Abdirahman Mohamoud Kayd is a Somaliland politician who currently serves as Somaliland's Minister of Foreign Affairs.

Early life 
Kayd was born in Hargeisa, Somaliland, 1960. After spending his teenage years in Djibouti, he went to school in France, graduating from the Université de la Timone with a Master of Neuroscience. Soon after, he found residence in Ottawa, Canada where he worked with the Ottawa Civic Hospital’s Institute of Neuroscience from 1990-1999 as a Neurodiagnostic Specialist.

Career 
In the early 2000s he moved to Boston, United States, where he worked as the Chief of the Neurophysiology Department at Brigham Women's Hospital. Having acquired many years of experience, he started to also work with Harvard Medical School Teaching Hospital, where he was responsible for training Harvard residents and fellow Doctors in Neurophysiology.

After almost 30 years abroad he followed an urge to do more and returned to his birth city of Hargeisa where he founded the Hargeisa Neurology Hospital in 2006. Dr. Essa Kayd is currently serving as the Minister of Foreign Affairs and International Cooperation. His focus is to build Somaliland’s international case whilst showing the world the potential advantage that Somaliland’s strategic location holds in the Horn of Africa for business, development and trade for landlocked countries in Africa.

Dr. Essa Kayd is fluent in French, English and Somali and has 9 children.

References

Foreign Ministers of Somaliland
Living people
Peace, Unity, and Development Party politicians
Year of birth missing (living people)
People from Hargeisa